WOVO (106.3 FM) is a radio station broadcasting an adult contemporary format. Licensed to Horse Cave, Kentucky, United States, the station serves the Bowling Green area.  The station is currently owned by Commonwealth Broadcasting through licensee Soky Radio, LLC and features programming from Westwood One.

History
The station originally signed on the air by Commonwealth Broadcasting as WLMK in 1991. In 1993, the station changed its call letters to WXPC, before eventually moving to WHHT in 1998.

Prior to 2005, WWHT broadcast a variety hits format as Sam FM, airing the syndicated network S.A.M.: Simply About Music from Westwood One. That year, the Sam FM format moved to WKLX (100.7 FM). In 2008, WHHT broadcast a hot adult contemporary format under the branding Star FM. That year, upgrades at Cumulus Media–owned WNFN (106.7 FM) in the Nashville metropolitan area resulted in WHHT shifting to 106.5 MHz.

In October 2012, Commonwealth Broadcasting instituted a major three-way format change. WHHT upgraded its signal in a move to 106.3 MHz. The station obtained the WOVO callsign and adult contemporary format from 105.3 FM, which became classic rock WPTQ. The station's previous country music format went to the rechristened WHHT at 103.7 FM.

Programming

HD Radio
The station's HD radio signal is multiplexed in this manner.

Previous logo
 (WOVO's logo under previous 105.3 frequency)

References

External links

Mainstream adult contemporary radio stations in the United States
HD Radio stations
OVO
Radio stations established in 1972